Lucretia Magnusdotter (Gyllenhielm) (1562-1624), was the illegitimate daughter of the Swedish prince Magnus, Duke of Östergötland, and Valborg Eriksdotter. She married the German noble Christoffer von Warnstedt (1542-1627) in 1586.

Life
As was the tradition with the illegitimate children of royalty, she was raised by her mother until the age of three. Thereafter, she was placed in the care of her aunt, Princess Elizabeth of Sweden, to whom she became a courtier as an adult.

In 1581, she followed Elizabeth to her wedding in Germany with Christopher, Duke of Mecklenburg-Gadebusch. There, she met the nobleman and courtier Christoffer von Warnstedt and wished to marry him, but she was not granted permission by John III of Sweden until 1586. 

The couple settled in Sweden, where her spouse became governor and she the  head lady in waiting (hovmästarinna)  to Maria of the Palatinate-Simmern, consort of her uncle King Charles IX of Sweden.

Issue

 Carl (1587-29 November 1607)
 Johan (1590 - 1628), married to Anna Kyle.
 Magnus (-1626)
 Christina (24 March 1600 - 15 April 1654)
 Melcher (June 1602 - 21 February 1655)

References

Other sources
 Gadd, Pia (Swedish): Frillor, fruar och herrar - en okänd kvinnohistoria (Mistresses, wives and masters - an unknown history of women) Falun 2009

Swedish ladies-in-waiting
1562 births
1624 deaths
16th-century Swedish women
15th-century Swedish women